Bluff Point is an unincorporated community in Pike Township, Jay County, in the U.S. state of Indiana.

History
Bluff Point was so named from its lofty elevation. The post office at Bluff Point was discontinued in 1904.

Geography

References

Unincorporated communities in Jay County, Indiana
Unincorporated communities in Indiana